Ryan Kitto is an Australian football (soccer) player who plays as a left back for Adelaide United.

Career

Adelaide United
Kitto started his career with West Torrens Birkalla, before signing for A-League club Adelaide United. He made his debut on 26 October 2013 for Adelaide United against Central Coast Mariners.

West Torrens Birkalla
In February 2015 returned to his home club West Torrens Birkalla. Kitto was awarded the 2015 Sergio Melta Medal (Player of the Year) after the 2015 NPL SA season making 28 appearances and scoring 17 goals.

Newcastle Jets
Kitto signed his second professional A-League deal with the Newcastle Jets as an injury replacement player following a successful trial with the club. Kitto made his Newcastle debut in Round 7 of the 2015–16 A-League season, coming on for Nigel Boogaard in the 82nd minute in a 0–0 draw against Adelaide United.

Ktto had one of his best career games in the final match of the 2015–16 A-League season against Central Coast Mariners, getting a hat-trick of assists.

Return to Adelaide United
On 23 May 2016, Kitto returned to Adelaide United. He started in Adelaide's first match of the 2016 FFA Cup on 2 August, and scored Adelaide's only goal in a 2–1 loss to Queensland state league side Redlands United in Brisbane.

After many eye-catching performances at the end of 2017, Kitto earned many plaudits, with Mark Bosnich describing him 'one of the best talents in the whole league'.

Kitto has won the FFA Cup two times with Adelaide United; the first final ending in a 2–1 victory over Sydney FC, and the second in a 4–0 victory over Melbourne City.

Career statistics

Club

External links

References 

Living people
Australian soccer players
Soccer players from Adelaide
Association football midfielders
Adelaide United FC players
Newcastle Jets FC players
A-League Men players
National Premier Leagues players
1994 births